Osmiopsis is a genus of Haitian flowering plants in the tribe Eupatorieae within the family Asteraceae.

Species
The only known species is Osmiopsis plumeri, native to Haiti.

References

Monotypic Asteraceae genera
Eupatorieae